Palaeolenus is an extinct genus of ptychopariid trilobites of the family Palaeolenidae. Species lived during the later part of the Botomian stage of the Cambrian Period, which lasted from approximately 524 to 518.5 million years ago. This faunal stage was part of the Cambrian Period

References

Palaeolenidae
Ptychopariida genera
Cambrian trilobites
Fossils of China